George Dewey "Deedy" Crosson (November 11, 1898 – February 19, 1973) was an American Negro league shortstop in the 1920s.

A native of Rutherford, New Jersey, Crosson attended Boston English High, Brown University and Boston University. He played for the Pennsylvania Red Caps of New York in 1920. Crosson died in New York, New York in 1973 at age 74.

References

External links
Baseball statistics and player information from Baseball-Reference Black Baseball Stats and Seamheads

1898 births
1973 deaths
Pennsylvania Red Caps of New York players
Baseball shortstops
Baseball players from New Jersey
People from Rutherford, New Jersey
Sportspeople from Bergen County, New Jersey
20th-century African-American sportspeople